Christopher A. Bray (born June 29, 1955) is a Vermont businessman and politician.  A Democrat, he served in the Vermont House of Representatives from 2007 to 2011.  Since 2013, he has represented the Addison District in the Vermont Senate.

Early life
Christopher Austin Bray was born in New Britain, Connecticut on June 29, 1955, a son of Dr. George H. Bray and Gertrude (Austin) Bray.  He attended the University of Vermont (UVM), from which he graduated in 1977 with a Bachelor of Arts degree in Zoology.  He received a Master of Arts degree in English from UVM in 1991.  He later attended the Bread Loaf Writers' Conference at Middlebury College.  He has also attended courses at Vermont Law School.

Career
Bray was employed as a product development specialist at corporations including National Life of Vermont, IBM, Intel, and Apple Inc. before founding his own business.  In addition, he taught English at UVM for four years.  He is the owner of Common Ground Communications, which provides writing, editing and document production services to the book publishing industry and makers of technical products.  Among the projects on which Bray worked was editing and publishing the autobiography of former governor Jim Douglas, 2014's The Vermont Way.  In addition, Bray's family operates an 82-acre farm in New Haven, "The Equestry", where they board horses and hounds.

Bray's civic and local government experience includes the board of directors of the United Way of Addison County, Middlebury Rotary Club, secretary of the Vermont Milk Commission, chairman of the Vermont Rural Economic Development Working Group, Vermont Forestry Study Group, National Conference of State Legislatures Agriculture & Energy Committee, New Haven justice of the peace, and president of the Middlebury Area Land Trust.

Vermont House of Representatives
In 2006, Bray graduated from the Snelling Center's Vermont Leadership Institute.  A Democrat, he was elected to the Vermont House of Representatives from the Addison 5 district in 2006 and reelected in 2008.  He served from January 2007 to January 2011 and was a member of the Agriculture Committee.  He was a lead sponsor of Vermont's Farm to Plate Program and the Biomass Energy Development Working Group, of which he was co-chairman until 2011.

Bray was elected to the University of Vermont board of trustees in 2009 and served until 2015.  In 2009, he received the Vermont Natural Resource Council's Legislative Leadership Award.  In 2010, received the Council of State Governments Henry Wolcott Toll Fellowship.  In 2012, he was appointed to the Vermont Supreme Court's Professional Responsibility Program.

In 2010, Bray was a candidate for the Democratic nomination for lieutenant governor.  He lost the August primary to fellow Representative Steve Howard, who lost the general election to the Republican nominee, Phil Scott.

Vermont Senate
In 2012, incumbent Democrat Harold W. Giard did not run for reelection to the Vermont Senate from the two-member at-large Addison County District.  Bray was a candidate for one of the two Democratic nominations, as was incumbent Claire D. Ayer, and they were nominated without opposition.  There were no Republican candidates in the November general election, and Bray and Ayer defeated independent Robert Wagner.  Bray's Senate term started in January 2013.  As of 2020, his committee assignments included Government Operations and Natural Resources and Energy.  He also served as chairman of the legislature's Joint Energy Committee, the Committee on Administrative Rules, the Legislative Study Committee on Wetlands, the Single-Use Products Working Group, and the Joint Carbon Emissions Reduction Committee.

Bray's previous Senate committee assignments included Education, Economic Development, Housing and General Affairs, Finance, the Joint Committee on Judicial Rules, and chairman of Natural Resources and Energy and the Legislative Information Technology Committee.

Family
In 1981, Bray married Susan Beth Raber.  They are the parents of two children, Benjamin and Kaitlin, and divorced in 2001.

Bray resides in New Haven, Vermont with his longtime partner, Kate Selby.

References

Sources

Internet

Newspapers

1955 births
Living people
21st-century American politicians
University of Vermont alumni
People from New Britain, Connecticut
People from New Haven, Vermont
Democratic Party members of the Vermont House of Representatives
Democratic Party Vermont state senators